Keşap is a town and a district of Giresun Province on the Black Sea coast of Turkey just to the east of the city of Giresun. 

Keşap itself is a small town of 8,617 people.

The TV sitcom Uy! Başuma Gelenler was filmed in a village in Keşap.

History
See Giresun for the long history of this area, dating back to the Persians and the Seleucids.

References

External links
Kesap (Kassiope)

tr, keşap

Populated places in Giresun Province
Fishing communities in Turkey
Populated coastal places in Turkey
Districts of Giresun Province
Towns in Turkey